Beautiful: The Carole King Musical is a jukebox musical with a book by Douglas McGrath that tells the story of the early life and career of Carole King, using songs that she wrote, often together with Gerry Goffin, and other contemporary songs by Barry Mann, Cynthia Weil, Phil Spector and others.

The original production of Beautiful received its world premiere at the Curran Theatre, San Francisco, in October 2013, with direction by Marc Bruni and choreography by Josh Prince, and starring Jessie Mueller in a Tony Award-winning performance as Carole King and Jake Epstein as Gerry Goffin. It made its Broadway debut at the Stephen Sondheim Theatre in January 2014. A West End production starring Katie Brayben as Carole began in February 2015. In March 2022, a new version of the production was launched for a UK tour from the Leicester Curve.

Productions

San Francisco pre-Broadway tryout (2013) 
Beautiful: The Carole King Musical had a pre-Broadway try-out in San Francisco, California, at the Curran Theatre from September 24, 2013 through October 20, with an official opening October 8. The production was staged by Marc Bruni, with choreography by Josh Prince and musical direction by Jason Howland. Jessie Mueller played Carole King. The musical sold out its entire run at the Curran Theatre.

Original Broadway production (2014–2019) 
The musical opened on Broadway at the Stephen Sondheim Theatre on January 12, 2014, after previews from November 12, 2013. In addition to Mueller as King, the cast features Jake Epstein as Gerry Goffin, Anika Larsen as Cynthia Weil and Jarrod Spector as Barry Mann. King attended the April 3, 2014 performance and appeared on stage with the cast at the curtain call, singing "You've Got a Friend" together with them. Carole also surprised actress and singer Melissa Benoist during her run as the titular character, praising her for her performance, and sang a reprise of "I Feel the Earth Move" with her and the audience on July 27, 2018. On the fifth anniversary of the production's opening on January 12, 2019, Carole King appeared on stage to perform the show's closing number "Beautiful" and finale alongside star Chilina Kennedy. The production closed on October 27, 2019 after 60 previews and 2,418 regular performances. Upon closing, the production was the 27th longest-running musical in Broadway history.

Original London production (2015–2017) 
A production in London's West End opened on February 25, 2015, following previews beginning February 10, 2015, at the Aldwych Theatre. On September 25, 2014, it was announced that British actress Katie Brayben would take the lead role of Carole King, with further casting including Alan Morrissey as Gerry Goffin, Gary Trainor as Don Kirshner, Glynis Barber as Genie Klein, Lorna Want as Cynthia Weil and Ian McIntosh as Barry Mann. Beginning November 30, 2015, Cassidy Janson took the lead role of Carole King and Diane Keen replaced Glynis Barber in the role of Genie Klein. it was announced on May 23, 2017 that the London production would close August 5, 2017.

U.S. Tour (2015–16) 
The musical began a U.S. tour starting in September 2015 in Providence, Rhode Island, at the Providence Performing Arts Center, with engagements across the United States, ending in San Francisco in August 2016. The role of Carole King was played by Abby Mueller (the sister of Jessie Mueller), with Liam Tobin as Gerry Goffin, Ben Fankhauser as Barry Mann and Becky Gulsvig as Cynthia Weil.

UK Tour (2017–18) 
A UK tour began September 2017 at the Alhambra Theatre in Bradford and ends at the New Theatre in Oxford in May 2018, starring former Over the Rainbow contestant Bronté Barbé as Carole King.

Australian Tour (2017–18) 
An Australian tour began in Sydney on 24 September 2017 at the Lyric Theatre. Esther Hannaford leads the production, playing Carole King. The musical opened in Melbourne at Her Majesty's Theatre on 22 February 2018. In Brisbane, performances began at the Lyric Theatre, QPAC on Friday 13 July 2018 running through to Sunday 2 September 2018.

Second U.S. Tour (2018–2020) 
A second U.S. National tour began September 4, 2018 at the Ellie Caulkins Opera House in Denver, CO. The role of Carole King is played by Sarah Bockel, with Dylan S. Wallach as Gerry Goffin, Alison Whitehurst as Cynthia Weil, and Jacob Heimer as Barry Mann.

Second U.K. Tour (2020) 
A second U.K tour began on January 11, 2020, at Churchill Theatre in Bromley, and was set to run until June 2020 but the tour was cut short due to the ongoing COVID-19 pandemic. Before the tour permanently closed the role of Carole King was played by Daisy Wood-Davis, with Adam Gillian as Gerry Goffin, Laura Baldwin as Cynthia Weil, and Cameron Sharp as Barry Mann.

Third U.K Tour (2022) 
A third U.K Tour opened at the Curve Theatre, Leicester on 28 February 2022. Produced by the Made at Curve, Theatre Royal Bath and Mayflower Southampton, directed by Nikolai Foster, the production is choreographed by Leah Hill, with a creative team featuring set designer Frankie Bradshaw, costume designer Edd Lindley, lighting designer and Curve associate Ben Cracknell, sound designer Tom Marshall, associate director Jennifer Lane Baker and casting director and Curve Associate Kay Magson CDG. The role of Carole King is played by Molly-Grace Cutler (The Worst Witch) with Tom Milner (Holby City) as Gerry Goffin, while Seren Sandham-Davies (Crazy For You) and Jos Slovick (Once) will play husband and wife song-writing duo Cynthia Weil and Barry Mann. After its run in Leicester the show visited Bath, Brighton, Edinburgh, Southampton, Newcastle, Dartford, Malvern, Cambridge, Cardiff, Eastbourne, Birmingham, Sheffield, Glasgow, Belfast, Nottingham, Manchester, Blackpool, Peterborough, Coventry, Cheltenham and Liverpool, finishing at the New Theatre, Oxford on 26 November 2022. This new version of the show received positive reviews.

US Regional Theatre Premiere (2022) 
Ogunquit Playhouse in Ogunquit, Maine, produced the US Regional Theatre Premiere, which played September 30, 2022 through October 30, 2022. The production starred Sarah Bockel as Carole King, Taylor Aronson as Cynthia Weil, Anthony Festa as Gerry Goffin, Suzanne Grodner as Genie Klein, Ben Jacoby as Barry Mann, and Matt Loehr as Don Kirschner. The production was directed by David Ruttura and choreographed by Joyce Chittick, recreating the original Broadway direction by Marc Bruni and choreography by Josh Prince. Nick Williams served as musical director.

Synopsis
From the Beautiful: The Carole King Musical cast recording booklet

Act I
At Carnegie Hall in 1971, Carole King sings "So Far Away". Then, in Brooklyn 1958, 16-year-old Carole tells her mother, Genie, she is going into Manhattan to try to sell a song to music publisher Donnie Kirshner. In the long tradition of mothers, Genie is opposed to her daughter's wish and in the equally long tradition of teenagers not caring about their mother's opinion, Carole goes anyway. At 1650 Broadway, she hears the "1650 Broadway Medley". She then sings her new song "It Might As Well Rain Until September". Donnie says he will take it and hopes she has others. At Queens College, Carole meets a handsome young lyricist named Gerry Goffin. They agree to collaborate, musically and romantically, which in both cases turns out to be a fertile arrangement. When they go to Donnie's to play their new song, Carole confesses to Gerry that she is pregnant. Gerry asks her to marry him. It gives her an extra depth of feeling when she sings their new song for Donnie, "Some Kind of Wonderful", which The Drifters then record.

They get an office at 1650. While there, Carole meets a new lyricist Cynthia Weil ("Happy Days Are Here Again"), who is looking for a composer to work with. Gerry and Carole sing their new song "Take Good Care of My Baby", during which Barry Mann, the composer with the office next door, enters. Barry meets Cynthia and they decide to collaborate. As they begin to work, sparks fly. Donnie tells them he needs a song for the Shirelles. The couples compete for the job. In Donnie's office the next morning, Carole and Gerry present "Will You Love Me Tomorrow". Cynthia and Barry perform "He's Sure the Boy I Love". Donnie picks Carole and Gerry's song for The Shirelles and it goes to no. 1. And so, on either side of the same wall, a competition is born. The two teams turn out an amazing parade of songs: "Up on the Roof", "On Broadway", "The Loco-Motion" and "You've Lost That Lovin' Feelin'".

Gerry and Carole are at the taping of a TV special where their new song, "One Fine Day", is being performed by the dazzling Janelle Woods. During a break, Gerry confesses to Carole that he is restless in their marriage. He wants to sleep with Janelle, and he doesn't want to lie about it. Carole is stunned. As the song begins again, she takes it over and sings it herself.

Act II
Carole is in a recording studio doing a demo of "Chains". Gerry is off with Janelle but tells her he will meet her later. Nick, a guitarist, asks Carole to come sing at the Bitter End sometime but she declines — she's a songwriter, not a singer. The thing with Gerry is getting her down so she goes and talks to Cynthia who is also having trouble with Barry — they split up. Carole decides to tell Gerry he has to end the affair with Janelle. As she leaves, Barry comes in. He and Cynthia make up and play their new song, "Walking in the Rain". Gerry shows up, but he is not making sense. He eventually has a breakdown. At the hospital, he tells Carole he will end the affair with Janelle and that he wants to come home. She suggests they make a new start and move to the suburbs ("Pleasant Valley Sunday").

Barry, Cynthia and Donnie come to see the new house. Barry plays their new song, "We Gotta Get Out of This Place". Depressed that he and Carole can't do as well, Gerry leaves in a funk for the city. While he is gone, it comes out that Barry and Cynthia have seen him with another woman, a singer named Marilyn Wald. Carole goes to Marilyn's apartment and Gerry is there. It's the final straw, and she ends their marriage. At the Bitter End, where Barry and Cynthia hear their song "Uptown", Carole explains she went to Los Angeles for a vacation and has started writing on her own. Nick, the guitarist from the studio who asked her to sing with his group, is playing there and urges her to sing. She sings her new song, "It's Too Late". She decides to move to Los Angeles. At 1650, she says goodbye to Donnie, Barry and Cynthia and plays them a parting present "You've Got a Friend".

In Los Angeles, she records her album, Tapestry. The session goes well until the last song, which she is afraid to sing. It's a song she wrote with Gerry and she is afraid of the feelings it may stir up. Her producer, Lou Adler, persuades her. She sings "(You Make Me Feel Like) A Natural Woman". The album is a smash. Carole is at Carnegie Hall for her concert, and is met by Gerry, who apologizes for the way he mistreated her in the past and gives her a final prediction - "you're going all the way". Carole takes to the piano, and performs for her audience.

Music

Musical numbers

Act 1
"So Far Away" - Carole King
"Oh Carol" - Neil Sedaka†
"1650 Broadway Medley" - Ensemble
"It Might as Well Rain Until September" - Carole King
"Be-Bop-A-Lula" - Ensemble†
"Some Kind of Wonderful" - Carole King, Gerry Goffin and The Drifters
"Happy Days Are Here Again" - Cynthia Weil
"Take Good Care of My Baby" - Gerry Goffin and Carole King
"Who Put the Bomp" - Barry Mann†
"Will You Love Me Tomorrow" - Carole King
"He's Sure the Boy I Love" - Cynthia Weil and Barry Mann
"Will You Love Me Tomorrow" - The Shirelles
"Up on the Roof" - Gerry Goffin and The Drifters 
"On Broadway" - The Drifters
"The Locomotion" - Little Eva and Ensemble
"You've Lost That Lovin' Feeling" - Barry Mann and The Righteous Brothers
"One Fine Day" - Janelle, Backup Singers and Carole King

Act 2
"Chains" - Carole King and Ensemble
"Walking in the Rain" - Barry Mann and Cynthia Weil
"Pleasant Valley Sunday" - Marilyn Wald, Gerry Goffin and Ensemble
"We Gotta Get Out of This Place" - Barry Mann
"Will You Love Me Tomorrow" (Reprise) - Carole King†
"Uptown" - "Uptown" Singer and Ensemble 
"It's Too Late" - Carole King and Ensemble
"You've Got a Friend" - Carole King, Barry Mann, Cynthia Weil and Don Kirshner
"(You Make Me Feel Like) A Natural Woman" - Carole King and Ensemble
"Beautiful" - Carole King and Company
"I Feel the Earth Move" - Carole King and Company

† Not included on the original Broadway Cast Album.

Orchestra
The musical uses a 12-member orchestra consisting of three keyboards, two guitars, bass, drums, percussion, two reeds, trumpet/flugelhorn, and trombone/bass trombone. In addition, the performer playing Carole King plays the piano or mimes as another performer plays.

Recordings
The Broadway cast album was recorded in February 2014 by Ghostlight Records and was released in digital form on April 1, 2014. It was in stores as of May 13, 2014. (The Broadway cast album includes the song "You've Got a Friend", although that song is not listed in the opening night playbill.) The album was also released on a vinyl format.

Principal roles and original casts

Notable cast replacements 

 Chilina Kennedy replaced Jessie Mueller in the role of Carole King on March 7, 2015 and played the role until June 3, 2018 with a stint on the US Tour. The role of Carole King was temporarily replaced by actress Melissa Benoist. In one show, Carole King appeared and surprised Benoist, later going up on stage and singing along with her. Kennedy returned for the musical's 5th anniversary on January 3, 2019. Kennedy has played over 1,000 performances as Carole King.
Abby Mueller (Jessie's sister) replaced Chilina Kennedy in the role of Carole King, who joined the US Tour, on March 7, 2017 through August 20, 2017, then returned from August 7, 2018 until December 30, 2018.
 Diane Keen replaced Glynis Barber in the role of Genie Klein on the West End on November 30, 2015.
 Jessica Keenan Wynn played Cynthia Weil until July 8, 2018.
 Kara Lindsay returned to play Cynthia Weil on July 10, 2018.
 Kate Reinders replaced Kara Lindsay in the role of Cynthia Weil on October 19, 2018.
 Vanessa Carlton replaced Chilina Kennedy as Carole King on June 27, 2019.

Critical reception
Ben Brantley, reviewing for The New York Times, called the musical a "friendly, formulaic bio-musical". He wrote that the musical shows the change in King from a modest songwriter to the popular and confident performer of those songs, showing the "real, conflicted person within the reluctant star."

Jesse Green, in his review for the New York Magazine, praised the performers but criticized the book, writing that the musical does not have the "dramatic coherence of book biomusicals". Similarly, Elyse Sommer, in her review for curtainup.com, praised the performers, especially Mueller, Spector and Larsen, as well as the "shimmery lighting" and the costumes. She wrote that while the musical "doesn't hang its songs on the greatest or most suspenseful story ever told, it has enough bounce and Broadway show glitz to keep you in your seat".

Awards and nominations

Original Broadway production

Original London production

Film adaptation 
On March 22, 2015, it was announced that Sony Pictures would be bringing the musical to the big screen with Douglas McGrath adapting his book into a screenplay and stage producer Paul Blake producing through Tom Hanks and Gary Goetzman's production company, Playtone.

In December 2022, Daisy Edgar-Jones was cast in the lead role of the film, with Lisa Cholodenko directing from a script she co-wrote with Stuart Blumberg.

Producers 
The producers of the original Broadway production include: Paul Blake, Sony/ATV Music Publishing, Jeffery A. Sine, Richard A. Smith, Mike Bosner, Harriet Newman Leve, Elaine Krauss, Terry Schnuck, Orin Wolf, Patty Baker, Roger Faxon, Larry Magrid, Kit Seidel, Lawrence S. Toppall, Fakston Productions, Mary Soloman, William C. Cohen, John Gore, Barbara Freitag, Loraine Alterman Boyle, Matthew C. Blank, Tim Hogue, Joel Hyatt, Marianne Mills, Michael J. Moritz Jr., StylesFour Production, Corey Brunish, Brisa Trinchero, Jeremiah J. Harris, Sherry Kondor (Executive Producer), Christine Russell (Executive Producer).

References

External links
 Official Broadway Site
 Official West End Site
 

2013 musicals
Biographical musicals
Broadway musicals
Carole King
Jukebox musicals
Rock musicals
Plays set in the 20th century
Plays set in Los Angeles
Plays set in New York City
Tony Award-winning musicals
Works by Douglas McGrath